Saravan (also Romanized as Sarāvān, Sarawān, and Seravan) is a village in Saravan Rural District, Sangar District, Rasht County, Gilan Province, Iran. At the 2006 census, its population was 5,740, in 1,511 families.

References 

Populated places in Rasht County